Dendroseris gigantea is a species of flowering plant in the family Asteraceae.
It is found only in Chile. It is threatened by habitat loss. Dendroseris gigantea has one plant representative left on Selkirk island, although it is being artificially planted on Robinson Crusoe Island.

References

Sources
 Why Robinson Crusoe Island is at Risk 

Alejandro Selkirk Island
gigantea
Flora of Chile
Critically endangered plants
Robinson Crusoe Island
Taxonomy articles created by Polbot